HMS Rodney was a battleship of the Victorian Royal Navy, a member of the  of warships designed by Nathaniel Barnaby. The ship was the last British battleship to carry a figurehead although smaller ships continued to carry them.

Design
This in turn produced a significant increase in the immersion of the armour belt, which was further increased when the coal bunkers were full. While this meant that under full-load condition the top of the belt approached the water-line, the view was taken that combat with a heavily armed enemy was very unlikely in the immediate vicinity of a British port, and steaming to a more distant potential battleground would use enough fuel to reduce the draught and bring the top of the belt well above water.

Guns
The manufacture of these guns took a much greater time than had been expected; this delay was the reason for the unusual prolongation of the time between the laying down of the ship and her completion.

During a refit in 1901, her 6-pounder quick-firing Hotchkiss guns were replaced with 6-pounder quick-firing mark I Nordenfelt guns.

Service history
Rodney was commissioned on 20 June 1888 into the Home Fleet. She was held in reserve until July 1889, and after taking part in manoevres until September 1889, she served with the Channel Fleet until May 1894. She was then posted to the Mediterranean Fleet, remaining there until 1897.

During her Mediterranean service, Rodney operated as part of the International Squadron, a multinational force made up of ships of the Austro-Hungarian Navy, French Navy, Imperial German Navy, Italian Royal Navy (Regia Marina), Imperial Russian Navy, and Royal Navy that intervened in the 1897–1898 Greek Christian uprising against the Ottoman Empire's rule in Crete. On 9 February 1897, she became one of the first ships to arrive off Crete, accompanying the battleship , flagship of Rear-Admiral Robert Harris, to reinforce the British ship on station at Crete, the battleship . In early March 1897, with the British consul at Canea, Alfred Biliotti, aboard, she took part in an International Squadron operation to rescue Ottoman soldiers and Cretan Turk civilians at Kandanos, Crete. She joined other ships in putting ashore an international landing party at Selino Kastelli on Crete′s southwest coast for the four-day expedition, which was placed under the command of Rodneys Captain John Harvey Rainier. In late March 1897, she shelled Cretan insurgents attempting to mine the walls of the Ottoman fort at Kastelli-Kissamos, driving them off, and the International Squadron landed 200 Royal Marines and 130 Austro-Hungarian sailors and marines to reprovision the fort and demolish nearby buildings that had provided cover for the mining effort.

Rodney departed the Mediterranean later in 1897. Thereafter she was the coastguard ship based on the Firth of Forth under the command of Captain Gerald Walter Russell until February 1901, when she sailed to Chatham for a refit. She remained in reserve until being sold in 1909.

References

Citations

Bibliography
 Clowes, Sir William Laird. The Royal Navy: A History From the Earliest Times to the Death of Queen Victoria, Volume Seven. London: Chatham Publishing, 1997. .  
 McTiernan, Mick, A Very Bad Place Indeed For a Soldier. The British involvement in the early stages of the European Intervention in Crete. 1897–1898, King's College, London, September 2014.
 Oscar Parkes,  British Battleships  
 

 

Admiral-class battleships
Victorian-era battleships of the United Kingdom
Ships built in Chatham
1884 ships